Gmina Wisznice is a rural gmina (administrative district) in Biała Podlaska County, Lublin Voivodeship, in eastern Poland.

Villages
Gmina Wisznice contains the villages and settlements of Curyn, Dołholiska, Dubica Dolna, Dubica Górna, Horodyszcze, Kolonia Wisznice, Łyniew, Marylin, Polubicze Dworskie, Polubicze Wiejskie, Ratajewicze, Rowiny, Wisznice and Wygoda.

Neighbouring gminas
Gmina Wisznice is bordered by the gminas of Jabłoń, Komarówka Podlaska, Łomazy, Milanów, Podedwórze, Rossosz and Sosnówka.

References

External links
Polish official population figures 2006

Gminas in Lublin Voivodeship
Biała Podlaska County